Dennis Lupu (born 13 August 2000) is an Italian-born Romanian football player. He also holds Italian citizenship.

Club career

Seregno
He first joined Seregno on loan in the winter of 2017, still in the junior teams. He made his Serie C debut for Seregno on 26 September 2021 in a game against Fiorenzuola.

References

External links
 

2000 births
Living people
Italian people of Romanian descent
Footballers from Lombardy
Romanian footballers
Italian footballers
Association football goalkeepers
Serie C players
Serie D players
U.S. 1913 Seregno Calcio players